Reacher is a mobile X‐Band Satellite ground terminal (SGT) acquired by the British Ministry Of Defence, it is designed to replace all medium and large legacy SGTs used in the land environment. It is intended to deliver services through Skynet 5 satellites, and to assist in the transition to TCP/IP network protocol services. Reacher was brought into service in 2007.

Secure communications are delivered through the Skynet 5 private finance initiative contract with Airbus Defence and Space (previously Paradigm Secure Communications) in partnership with Information Systems and Services at MoD Corsham.

Variants
Reacher came initially in three variants, 44 of which were delivered to the military:

 Reacher Large, mounted on a MOWAG Duro III vehicle, provides an assured data rate of 8 Mbit/s through a  antenna. Reacher Large takes15  minutes to set up and can only be used when stationary.
 Reacher Medium is mounted on a MOWAG Duro III 6 x 6 vehicle and provides an assured data rate of 2 Mbit/s through a  antenna. It is ready for immediate use.
 Reacher Royal Marine (RM). Reacher RM is mounted on two amphibious  Bandvagn 206 vehicles and provides an assured data rate of 2 Mbit/s through a 2.4 m antenna. It is designed for use in amphibious warfare. It has been used in operation telic and herrick on land in the same role as Reacher Medium.

As of 2014, two new variants were under development:
 High Capacity Reacher, a variant of Reacher Medium to deliver throughput up to 32 Mbit/s
 Reacher Hub, a variant of Reacher Large to deliver throughput up to 64 Mbit/s and the ability to interoperate with commercial satellite terminals

Transport
All Reacher terminals are transportable using Chinook helicopters (underslung). The Large variant can be transported by C17 and the Medium and RM variants by C130.

References

Military communications of the United Kingdom